Carry the Banner is the third EP by the Berkeley, California-based punk rock band Pinhead Gunpowder. Originally released on 10" vinyl in December 1994 through Too Many Records, the EP was reissued on CD by Lookout Records shortly after as the initial vinyl pressing sold out quickly. It was the group's first release to feature Jason White on guitar/vocals, replacing Sarah Kirsch, who left the band in 1994 due to differences with Billie Joe Armstrong after his main band Green Day signed to major label Reprise Records. 

The EP was reissued in February 2010 on 12" vinyl though Recess Records. However, upon the band's request, the label cancelled the reissue and most of the copies in stock were destroyed, as were the label's other Pinhead Gunpowder vinyl reissues. The few copies sold of the reissue now go for high prices online. In August 27, 2021 the album was reissued again in 12" vinyl by 1-2-3-4 Go! Records.

Track listing

Personnel
 Aaron Cometbus – drums
 Billie Joe Armstrong – vocals, guitar
 Jason White – vocals, guitar
 Bill Schneider – bass, vocals

Production
 Kevin Army – producer, engineer
 John Golden - mastering
 Aaron Cometbus - cover art, graphic design
 Bill Schneider - photography

References

1994 EPs
Pinhead Gunpowder albums
Lookout! Records EPs